Wyoming Highway 191 (WYO 191) is a  state highway in Johnson County, Wyoming.

Route description
Wyoming Highway 191 begins its western end in the community of Mayoworth, located northwest of Kaycee. From there WYO 191 travels southeast towards Kaycee. Nearing its end the eastern terminus of Wyoming Highway 190 (Barnum Road), which serves the outlying community of Barnum, is intersected before meeting an interchange with I-25/US 87 at exit 254 in Kaycee.  later WYO 191 reaches its eastern terminus at Wyoming Highway 196 and the western terminus of Wyoming Highway 192 (Sussex Road) in Kaycee.

Major intersections

References

External links

Wyoming Routes 100-199
WYO 191 - WYO 192/WYO 196 to I-25/US 87
WYO 191 - I-25/US 87 to WYO 190
WYO 191 - WYO 190 to Mayoworth
Kaycee, WY Chamber of Commerce

Transportation in Johnson County, Wyoming
191